John Fegan may refer to:
 John Fegan (politician) (1862–1932), Australian politician
 John Fegan (actor) (1907–1981), Irish Australian film and television actor
 John Fegan (rugby union) (1872–1949), English rugby union player